The 1997 Swedish Golf Tour, known as the Telia InfoMedia Tour for sponsorship reasons, was the twelfth season of the Swedish Golf Tour, a series of professional golf tournaments for women held in Sweden.

Nina Karlsson won two tournaments and the Order of Merit ahead of Catrin Nilsmark.

Schedule
The season consisted of 13 tournaments played between May and September, where one event was included on the 1997 Ladies European Tour.

Order of Merit

Source:

See also
1997 Swedish Golf Tour (men's tour)

References

External links
Official homepage of the Swedish Golf Tour

Swedish Golf Tour (women)
Swedish Golf Tour (women)